Klara Melissa Kössler (born 4 March 2000) is a German football player who plays as a forward for the Germany national team.

Club career 

Kössler played for 1. FFC Turbine Potsdam from 2006 to 2017, going through all youth teams in the U7 to U17 age groups. With the B-Juniors she won the German Championship in both 2015 and 2016. In 2017 she won second place in the final. In 2016/17, in addition to her appearances for the B-Juniors, she also played in 15 league games for the second women's team in the 2nd Bundesliga North. For the 2017/18 season she signed a two-year contract for the Bundesliga team, but initially continued to play for the second team. Her debut in a competitive first-team match followed on 15 April 2018 in the 3-1 DFB Cup semi-final against FC Bayern Munich when she came on for Anna Gasper in the 60th minute. She finally made her Bundesliga debut three days later, on 18 April 2018 (matchday 14), when she started the 1-0 home win against SC Freiburg and was substituted for Wibke Meister in the 72nd minute.

In the summer of 2019, she moved to the United States to join the UMass Minutewomen at the University of Massachusetts Amherst for a dual career of college and soccer.  She returned after just a year, scoring 11 goals in 16 games for the varsity athletic team.  In the 2021/22 season, she was Turbine Potsdam's second top scorer after Selina Cerci with 10 goals and joined league rivals TSG 1899 Hoffenheim after that season.

International career 
Kössler made her international debut on 12 May 2016 in a 3-1 victory of the U16 national team against Austria. She was then part of the squad of the U17 national team. With this team she qualified for the European Championships in the Czech Republic in 2017. In the penalty shoot-out in the final match against Spain, she put her team ahead 3-1, and won the European title.  She was the tournament's top scorer with three goals. In 2017 she became a member of the U19 national team, with which she competed in the 2018 European Championship in Switzerland, where she became runner-up after a 1-0 final defeat by Spain. Kössler played in all five tournament games.

Her goal during the 2019 European Under-19 Championship to make it 3-0 in the group game against Belgium on 19 July in the 53rd minute, when she beat the Belgian goalkeeper from distance, won second place for goal of the month for July 2019.

Honours 

 Club

 German B Junior Champion 2015 and 2016 (with 1. FFC Turbine Potsdam)

 National team

 U17 European Champion: 2017
 U19 Vice European Champion: 2018, 2019

References

External links 
 Melissa Koessler in the database of the German Football Association
 Melissa Koessler/ in the weltfussball.de database
 Melissa Kössler in the soccerdonna.de database
 Melissa Koessler in the FuPa.net database

Living people
2000 births
German women's footballers
Women's association football forwards
TSG 1899 Hoffenheim (women) players
1. FFC Turbine Potsdam players
Sportspeople from Potsdam
People from Potsdam
Association football forwards
Germany women's youth international footballers
Germany international footballers